The Severnaya Sosva ("Northern Sosva”; Mansi: Та̄гт-я̄, Tāgt-jā) is a river in Khanty-Mansi Autonomous Okrug, Russia, which drains the northern Ural Mountains into the lower Ob. It discharges into the Malaya Ob, a branch of the Ob.

Geography
The river and its tributaries are basically T-shaped. The Khulga and Lyapin flow south for about  parallel to the Urals while the main Northern Sosva flows about  northward. The united rivers then flow east southeast about  almost to the Ob near Igrim and then flow north about  before joining the Ob at Beryozovo. Its headwaters are just east of the headwaters of the Pechora on the other side of the Urals and somewhat north of the headwaters of the southeast-flowing Pelym. 

It is frozen between November and April and floods (mostly snowmelt) from May to September. Like many rivers in the West Siberian Plain, it has an extensive flood plain with marshes and meanders. In spring the area near the Ob often floods. The channel width sometimes approaches  and the flood plain . The river is navigable by ships in the lower region.

There are two Malaya Sosva rivers. The larger flows north to join the Northern Sosva near Igrim. The other joins the Bolshaya Sosva to form the Northern Sosva.

Trade route
There was some ill-documented Russian trade in the area before the Russian conquest of Siberia. After about 1593 the Northern Sosva was one of the main routes into Siberia (for the others, see Verkhoturye). The route ran from the Pechora River, up the Shchugor River, over either of two passes and down the Sosva to the Ob and the fur-rich Mangazeya region. By the late 17th century the fur trade declined and most trade shifted south to Verkhoturye and some north to the Usa.

See also
List of rivers of Russia

References

Rivers of Khanty-Mansi Autonomous Okrug